Nucha (born Cristina Isabel dos Santos Baldaia Trindade, 21 June 1966, Águeda) is a Portuguese singer, best known for her participation in the 1990 Eurovision Song Contest.

Biography
Nucha's first participation in Portugal's Eurovision selection, Festival da Canção, was in 1988 with the song "Se calhar", but this failed to pass the semi-final stage. She entered Festival da Canção a second time in 1990, and this time was successful with the song "Há sempre alguém" ("There's Always Someone") winning the juries' vote.  "Há sempre alguém" went forward to the 35th Eurovision Song Contest, held on 5 May in Zagreb, where it did not prove popular, finishing in 20th place of the 22 entries, having received points only from the Luxembourg and United Kingdom juries.  However, the song did prove to be popular in Portugal.

Nucha's first album, Tu vais ver, was released in 1992, followed two years later by the more successful Todos me querem.  Four further albums followed in the 1990s, and she also became a familiar face on Portuguese television with many appearances on entertainment programmes. She remained a regular on TV into the 2000s, but her recording career was on hold for several years until the release of the album Regresso in 2007.

Nucha made a surprise return to Festival da Canção in 2009 with "Tudo está na tua mão", placing fourth.

In 2013, she entered in Big Brother VIP, where she stayed 28 days after being evicted by the public.

Albums discography 
1992: Tu vais ver
1994: Todos me querem
1996: Sedução
1997: Anda
1998: Luz
1999: Destino
2007: Regresso

References

External links 
  (Portuguese)
 Festival da Canção 1990 (Portuguese – includes audio)

1966 births
Living people
Eurovision Song Contest entrants of 1990
Eurovision Song Contest entrants for Portugal
21st-century Portuguese women singers
20th-century Portuguese women singers